Booch may refer to:

 Grady Booch (born 1955), software engineer
 Booch method, a method for object-oriented software development developed by Grady Booch
Kombucha, a fermented tea drink